Sergio García Malfavón (born 14 August 1987, in Uruapan, Michoacán) is a judo practitioner from Mexico who competes in the men's half-heavyweight division.

García has won multiple medals representing his country at the Central American and Caribbean Games and at the Pan American Games.

References

External links
 

1987 births
Living people
Mexican male judoka
Sportspeople from Michoacán
People from Uruapan
Pan American Games bronze medalists for Mexico
Judoka at the 2011 Pan American Games
Pan American Games medalists in judo
Central American and Caribbean Games silver medalists for Mexico
Central American and Caribbean Games bronze medalists for Mexico
Competitors at the 2010 Central American and Caribbean Games
Competitors at the 2014 Central American and Caribbean Games
Central American and Caribbean Games medalists in judo
Medalists at the 2011 Pan American Games
20th-century Mexican people
21st-century Mexican people